Cedar Creek is a  long 2nd order tributary to the Uwharrie River, in Montgomery County, North Carolina.

Course
Cedar Creek rises on the Rocky Creek divide about 3 miles southeast of Uwharrie in Montgomery County, North Carolina.  Cedar Creek then flows generally west to meet the Uwharrie River about 2 miles southwest of Uwharrie.

Watershed
Cedar Creek Creek drains  of area, receives about 47.9 in/year of precipitation, has a topographic wetness index of 339.72 and is about 92% forested.

See also
List of rivers of North Carolina

References

Rivers of North Carolina
Rivers of Montgomery County, North Carolina